Sandra Hill (born 16 June 1998) is a Cambodian futsal player and a footballer who plays as a defender for American college team Grand Canyon Antelopes. She has been a member of the Cambodia women's national team.

Early life
Hill was born in Cambodia to an Australian father and a Cambodian mother, Prak Chenda, a former player of the Cambodia women's national volleyball team and a sister of football manager and former player Prak Sovannara. She was raised in Canberra, Australia and attended Canberra College.

International career
Hill capped for Cambodia at senior level during the 2018 AFF Women's Championship.

References

1998 births
Living people
Cambodian women's footballers
Women's association football defenders
Women's association football forwards
Grand Canyon Antelopes women's soccer players
Cambodia women's international footballers
Cambodian people of Australian descent
Cambodian expatriate footballers
Cambodian expatriates in the United States
Expatriate women's soccer players in the United States
Women's futsal players
Sportspeople from Canberra
Soccer players from the Australian Capital Territory
Australian women's soccer players
Australian people of Cambodian descent
Australian expatriate women's soccer players
Australian expatriate sportspeople in the United States
Australian women's futsal players